Daniel George "Danny" Bolduc (born April 6, 1953) is an American retired professional ice hockey player who played in the National Hockey League and World Hockey Association between 1976 and 1984. 

Bolduc grew up in Waterville, Maine and attended Phillips Academy, Andover, Massachusetts from 1970 to 1972. He played three years at Harvard University before joining the Olympic team.

Bolduc was a member of the Detroit Red Wings and Calgary Flames of the NHL as well as the WHA New England Whalers after starring for the US team in the 1976 Winter Olympics as well as the Harvard University men's hockey team in the early 1970s. He also represented the United States in the 1976 Canada Cup and 1979 World Championships.

Career statistics

Regular season and playoffs

International

External links 
 
Higgins & Bolduc

1953 births
Living people
Adirondack Red Wings players
American men's ice hockey left wingers
Calgary Flames players
Colorado Flames players
Detroit Red Wings players
Harvard Crimson men's ice hockey players
Ice hockey people from Maine
Ice hockey players at the 1976 Winter Olympics
Kansas City Red Wings players
Moncton Golden Flames players
New England Whalers players
Nova Scotia Voyageurs players
Olympic ice hockey players of the United States
People from Waterville, Maine
Rhode Island Reds players
Springfield Indians players
Undrafted National Hockey League players